John Brandon Bell II (born December 20, 1958) is an American former Virginia state senator and small businessman from Charlottesville. Bell was state senator for two non-consecutive terms, replacing Republican State Senator Malfourd W. Trumbo in an open race over Democratic Party Candidate Stephen H. Emick (a relative of Malfourd's predecessor Dudley J. Emick Jr.) when Trumbo retired after 3 terms, having first been elected in 1991.

Bell did not continue on to the General Election four years later in 2007, having lost the Republican Party Primary by 75 votes to the former one term  Roanoke Mayor Ralph K. Smith, largely due to his proposal of a bill seeking to ban smoking in private businesses throughout the state, a bill which failed, however a similar bill, sponsored by Senator Ralph Northam, a Democrat from Norfolk, succeeded in banning smoking in private businesses in 2009.

Electoral history

References

1958 births
Living people